The 2020 Oakland Athletics season was the 120th season for the Oakland Athletics franchise, all as members of the American League, and their 54th season in Oakland (all at Oakland Coliseum). The season saw the Athletics win the American League West for the first time since 2013.

On March 12, 2020, MLB announced that because of the ongoing COVID-19 pandemic, the start of the regular season would be delayed by at least two weeks in addition to the remainder of spring training being cancelled. Four days later, it was announced that the start of the season would be pushed back indefinitely due to the recommendation made by the CDC to restrict events of more than 50 people for eight weeks. On June 23, commissioner Rob Manfred unilaterally implemented a 60-game season. Players reported to training camps on July 1 in order to resume spring training and prepare for a July 24 Opening Day.

The A's hit two walk-off grand slams in their first 11 games of the season. They became the 17th team to hit two walk-off slams in the same year, the third team to hit two in an 11-game span and the fastest to do so from the start of the season.

On September 21, 2020, the A's clinched the American League West championship and then defeated the Chicago White Sox in three games in the 2020 American League Wild Card Series. This was the A's first postseason series victory since 2006 and won their first winner-take-all postseason game since Game 7 of the 1973 World Series (snapping an MLB record nine-game losing streak in such contests). However, they lost to the Houston Astros in the 2020 American League Division Series.

Offseason

Rule changes 
For the 2020 season, MLB instituted several new rule changes including the following:

 Single trade deadline – there will no longer be a waiver trade deadline later in the year.
 26-man roster – rosters will expand from 25 players, but no team may carry more than 13 pitchers.
 Three-batter minimum for pitchers - a pitcher must face three batters in a game before they can be removed unless there is an injury or the end of an inning.

Further rule changes came into effect in response to the COVID-19 pandemic including the use of the DH in the National League, a shortened schedule, and starting extra innings with a runner at second base.

Regular season

Standings

Record against opponents

Game log

|- style="background:#bfb;"
| 1 || July 24 || Angels || 7–3  || Smith (1–0) || Robles (0–1) || — || 1–0 || W1
|- style="background:#fbb;"
| 2 || July 25 || Angels || 1–4 || Bundy (1–0) || Manaea (0–1) || Robles (1) || 1–1 || L1
|- style="background:#bfb;"
| 3 || July 26 || Angels || 6–4 || Petit (1–0) || Ohtani (0–1) || Hendriks (1) || 2–1 || W1
|- style="background:#bfb;"
| 4 || July 27 || Angels || 3–0 || Smith (2–0) || Canning (0–1) || Soria (1) || 3–1 || W2
|- style="background:#fbb;"
| 5 || July 28 || Rockies || 3–8 || Senzatela (1–0) || Mengden (0–1) || — || 3–2 || L1
|- style="background:#fbb;"
| 6 || July 29 || Rockies || 1–5 || Márquez (1–1) || Montas (0–1) || — || 3–3 || L2
|- style="background:#fbb;"
| 7 || July 31 || @ Mariners || 3–5 || Walker (1–1) || Manaea (0–2) || Williams (2) || 3–4 || L3
|-

|- style="background:#bfb;"
| 8 || August 1 || @ Mariners || 3–2  || Soria (1–0) || Altavilla (1–1) || Hendriks (2) || 4–4 || W1
|- style="background:#bfb;"
| 9 || August 2 || @ Mariners || 3–2 || Bassitt (1–0) || Graveman (0–2) || Hendriks (3) || 5–4 || W2
|- style="background:#bfb;"
| 10 || August 3 || @ Mariners || 11–1 || Montas (1–1) || Sheffield (0–2) || — || 6–4 || W3
|- style="background:#bfb;"
| 11 || August 4 || Rangers || 5–1 || Hendriks (1–0) || Vólquez (0–1) || — || 7–4 || W4
|- style="background:#bfb;"
| 12 || August 5 || Rangers || 6–4 || McFarland (1–0) || Gibaut (0–1) || Soria (2) || 8–4 || W5
|- style="background:#bfb;"
| 13 || August 6 || Rangers || 6–4 || Fiers (1–0) || Minor (0–3) || Hendriks (4) || 9–4 || W6
|- style="background:#bfb;"
| 14 || August 7 || Astros || 3–2  || Wendelken (1–0) || Sneed (0–1) || — || 10–4 || W7
|- style="background:#bfb;"
| 15 || August 8 || Astros || 3–1 || Montas (2–1) || Valdez (0–2) || Hendriks (5) || 11–4 || W8
|- style="background:#bfb;"
| 16 || August 9 || Astros || 7–2 || Luzardo (1–0) || Javier (1–1) || Smith (1) || 12–4 || W9
|- style="background:#fbb;"
| 17 || August 10 || @ Angels || 9–10 || Peña (1–0) || Petit (1–1) || Buttrey (2) || 12–5 || L1
|- style="background:#fbb;"
| 18 || August 11 || @ Angels || 0–6 || Bundy (3–1) || Fiers (1–1) || — || 12–6 || L2 
|- style="background:#bfb;"
| 19 || August 12 || @ Angels || 8–4 || Bassitt (2–0) || Canning (0–3) || — || 13–6 || W1
|- style="background:#bfb;"
| 20 || August 14 || @ Giants || 8–7  || Soria (2–0) || García (0–1) || Hendriks (6) || 14–6 || W2
|- style="background:#bfb;"
| 21 || August 15 || @ Giants || 7–6 || McFarland (2–0) || Gott (1–1) || Hendriks (7) || 15–6 || W3
|- style="background:#bfb;"
| 22 || August 16 || @ Giants || 15–3 || Fiers (2–1) || Webb (1–2) || — || 16–6 || W4
|- style="background:#fbb;"
| 23 || August 17 || @ Diamondbacks || 3–4 || Crichton (2–0) || Soria (2–1) || — || 16–7 || L1
|- style="background:#fbb;"
| 24 || August 18 || @ Diamondbacks || 1–10 || Weaver (1–3) || Montas (2–2) || — || 16–8 || L2
|- style="background:#bfb;"
| 25 || August 19 || Diamondbacks || 4–1 || Luzardo (2–0) || Kelly (3–2) || Hendriks (8) || 17–8 || W1
|- style="background:#bfb;"
| 26 || August 20 || Diamondbacks || 5–1 || Manaea (1–2) || Young (1–1) || — || 18–8 || W2
|- style="background:#bfb;"
| 27 || August 21 || Angels || 5–3 || Fiers (3–1) || Heaney (1–2) || Hendriks (9) || 19–8 || W3
|- style="background:#fbb;"
| 28 || August 22 || Angels || 3–4 || Andriese (1–1) || Bassitt (2–1) || Buttrey (3) || 19–9 || L1
|- style="background:#bfb;"
| 29 || August 23 || Angels || 5–4  || Hendriks (2–0) || Buttrey (1–1) || — || 20–9 || W1
|- style="background:#fbb;"
| 30 || August 24 || @ Rangers || 2–3 || Lynn (4–0) || Luzardo (2–1) || Montero (6) || 20–10 || L1
|- style="background:#bfb;"
| 31 || August 25 || @ Rangers || 10–3 || Manaea (2–2) || Gibson (1–3) || — || 21–10 || W1
|- style="background:#bfb;"
| 32 || August 26 || @ Rangers || 3–1 || Fiers (4–1) || Allard (0–3) || Hendriks (10) || 22–10 || W2
|- style="background:#bbb;"
| — || August 27 || @ Rangers || colspan=7 | Postponed (strikes due to shooting of Jacob Blake); Makeup: September 12 
|- style="background:#bbb;"
| — || August 28 || @ Astros || colspan=7 | Postponed (strikes due to Jacob Blake shooting); Makeup: August 29
|- style="background:#fbb;"
| 33 || August 29 || @ Astros || 2–4  || McCullers Jr. (3–2) || Bassitt (2–2) || Pressly (5) || 22–11 || L1
|- style="background:#fbb;"
| 34 || August 29 || @ Astros || 3–6  || Greinke (2–0) || Montas (2–3) || Pressly (6) || 22–12 || L2
|- style="background:#bbb;"
| — || August 30 || @ Astros || colspan=7 | Postponed (COVID-19); Makeup: September 8
|-

|- style="background:#bbb;"
| — || September 1 || @ Mariners || colspan=7 | Postponed (COVID-19); Makeup: September 14
|- style="background:#bbb;"
| — || September 2 || @ Mariners || colspan=7 | Postponed (COVID-19); Makeup: September 14
|- style="background:#bbb;"
| — || September 3 || @ Mariners || colspan=7 | Postponed (COVID-19); Makeup: September 26
|- style="background:#fbb;"
| 35 || September 4 || Padres || 0–7 || Davies (6–2) || Luzardo (2–2) || — || 22–13 || L3
|- style="background:#bfb;"
| 36 || September 5 || Padres || 8–4 || Manaea (3–2) || Paddack (3–4) || — || 23–13 || W1
|- style="background:#fbb;"
| 37 || September 6 || Padres || 3–5 || Richards (2–2) || Fiers (4–2) || Rosenthal (8) || 23–14 || L1
|- style="background:#bfb;"
| 38 || September 7 || Astros || 6–0 || Bassitt (3–2) || Javier (4–2) || — || 24–14 || W1
|- style="background:#bfb;"
| 39 || September 8  || @ Astros || 4–2  || Montas (3–3) || Greinke (3–1) || Hendriks (11) || 25–14 || W2
|- style="background:#fbb;"
| 40 || September 8  || Astros || 4–5  || Paredes (2–2) || Wendelken (1–1) || Pressly (8) || 25–15 || L1
|- style="background:#bfb;"
| 41 || September 9 || Astros || 3–2 || Hendriks (3–0) || Pressly (1–2) || — || 26–15 || W1
|- style="background:#bfb;"
| 42 || September 10 || Astros || 3–1 || Manaea (4–2) || Urquidy (0–1) || Hendriks (12) || 27–15 || W2
|- style="background:#bfb;"
| 43 || September 11 || @ Rangers || 10–6 || Fiers (5–2) || García (0–2) || — || 28–15 || W3
|- style="background:#fbb;"
| 44 || September 12  || @ Rangers || 2–5  || Benjamin (1–0) || Jefferies (0–1) || Montero (8) || 28–16 || L1
|- style="background:#bfb;"
| 45 || September 12  || @ Rangers || 10–1 || Bassitt (4–2) || Allard (0–6) || — || 29–16 || W1
|- style="background:#fbb;"
| 46 || September 13 || @ Rangers || 3–6 || Lynn (6–2) || Montas (3–4) || — || 29–17 || L1
|- style="background:#fbb;"
| 47 || September 14  || @ Mariners || 5–6  || Gonzales (6–2) || Soria (2–2) || Hirano (2) || 29–18 || L2
|- style="background:#bfb;"
| 48 || September 14  || @ Mariners || 9–0  || Minor (1–5) || Yacabonis (0–1) || — || 30–18 || W1
|- style="background:#fbb;"
| 49 || September 15 || @ Rockies || 1–3 || Senzatela (4–2) || Manaea (4–3) || — || 30–19 || L1
|- style="background:#bfb;"
| 50 || September 16 || @ Rockies || 3–1 || Fiers (6–2) || Márquez (2–6) || Hendriks (13) || 31–19 || W1
|- style="background:#bfb;"
| 51 || September 18 || Giants || 6–0 || Bassitt (5–2) || Webb (2–4) || — || 32–19 || W2
|- style="background:#bfb;"
| 52 || September 19 || Giants || 6–0 || Luzardo (3–2) || Gausman (3–3) || — || 33–19 || W3
|- style="background:#fbb;"
| 53 || September 20 || Giants || 2–14 || Anderson (3–3) || Minor (1–6) || — || 33–20 || L1
|- style="background:#fbb;"
| 54 || September 22 || @ Dodgers || 2–7 || May (2–1) || Montas (3–5) || — || 33–21 || L2
|- style="background:#bfb;"
| 55 || September 23 || @ Dodgers || 6–4 || Diekman (1–0) || Treinen (3–3) || Hendriks (14) || 34–21 || W1
|- style="background:#fbb;"
| 56 || September 24 || @ Dodgers || 1–5 || Floro (3–0) || Fiers (6–3) || — || 34–22 || L1
|- style="background:#bfb;"
| 57 || September 25 || Mariners || 3–1  || Diekman (2–0) || Gerber (1–1) || — || 35–22 || W1
|- style="background:#fbb;"
| 58 || September 26  || Mariners || 1–5  || Graveman (1–3) || Hendriks (3–1) || — || 35–23 || L1
|- style="background:#fbb;"
| 59 || September 26  || @ Mariners || 3–12  || Dunn (4–1) || Blackburn (0–1) || — || 35–24 || L2
|- style="background:#bfb;"
| 60 || September 27 || Mariners || 6–2 || Petit (2–1) || Hirano (0–1) || — || 36–24 || W1
|-

|- style="text-align:center;"
| Legend:       = Win       = Loss       = PostponementBold = Athletics team member

Roster

Postseason

Game log

|-style="background:#fbb;"
| 1 || September 29 || White Sox || 1–4 || Giolito (1–0) || Luzardo (0–1) || Colomé (1) || 0–1
|-style="background:#bfb;"
| 2 || September 30 || White Sox || 5–3 || Bassitt (1–0) || Keuchel (0–1) || Diekman (1) || 1–1
|-style="background:#bfb;"
| 3 || October 1 || White Sox || 6–4 || Montas (1–0) || Marshall (0–1) || Hendriks (1) || 2–1
|-

|- style="background:#fbb;"
| 1 || October 5 || Astros || 5–10 || Taylor (1–0) || Wendelken (0–1) || — || 0–1
|- style="background:#fbb;"
| 2 || October 6 || Astros || 2–5 || Valdez (1–0) || Manaea (0–1) || Pressly (1) || 0–2
|- style="background:#bfb;"
| 3 || October 7 || @ Astros || 9–7 || Hendriks (1–0) || Raley (0–1) || — || 1–2
|- style="background:#fbb;"
| 4 || October 8 || @ Astros || 6–11 || Javier (1–0) || Montas (0–1) || — || 1–3
|-

|

Wild Card Series 
The A's hosted the Chicago White Sox at the Oakland Coliseum in the Wild Card series.

Game 1 
Rookie left hander Jesús Luzardo got the ball for Game 1 against White Sox ace Lucas Giolito. Outfielder Adam Engel got the scoring started with a solo home run. MVP candidate José Abreu added a 2-run home run. Meanwhile, Giolito carried a perfect game into the 7th inning before giving up a leadoff single to Tommy La Stella. Giolito would end up going 7+ innings, allowing 1 run. Yasmani Grandal added a solo home run in the 8th. A's outfielder Ramón Laureano grounded into a force play to make it 4–1 before White Sox closer Álex Colomé shut the door in the 9th inning.

Game 2
A's ace Chris Bassitt got the ball for Game 2 against White Sox lefty Dallas Keuchel. The A's got ahead early with an fielding error from White Sox 2nd baseman Nick Madrigal that scored 2 runs. A's shortstop Marcus Semien added a 2-run home run in the 2nd and A's DH Khris Davis added a solo home run in the 4th inning, chasing Keuchel from the game after . Bassitt would pitch , allowing 1 run. Grandal hit his 2nd home run of the series off A's closer Liam Hendriks and Grandal would bring in a run via a bases loaded walk. Diekman replaced Hendriks and got Jose Abreu to ground out to tie the series and send the series to a winner-take-all Game 3.

Game 3 
The A's sent out right hander Mike Fiers, while the White Sox counted with righty Dane Dunning. The White Sox struck first on a monster home run from rookie Luis Robert. The White Sox added two more runs in the 3rd inning on an RBI single from Robert and an RBI double from Nomar Mazara. The A's got back into the game with a 2-run home run from rookie catcher Sean Murphy, then back 2 back bases loaded walks gave the A's the lead, 4–3. The White Sox tied the game on an RBI single from Mazara. The A's added insurance in the 6th with a 2-run single from utility player Chad Pinder. A's closer Liam Hendriks, who threw 49 pitches in Game 2, pitched around a leadoff single from White Sox catcher James McCann, striking out Yoan Moncada, Robert & Mazara to send the A's to the ALDS against the Houston Astros.

ALDS
The A's lost to their division rivals, the Houston Astros in the ALDS.

Game 1
The A's announced that ace Chris Bassitt would get the ball for Game 1 against right hander Lance McCullers Jr. A's DH Khris Davis got the scoring started with a 2-run home run in the 2nd inning, followed by a Sean Murphy solo shot in the 3rd inning. The Astros responded with a solo home run from Alex Bregman and a game-tying home run from Carlos Correa in the top of the 4th. The A's responded quickly with a solo shot from Matt Olson to put the A's back in front, 4–3. A Mark Canha sacrifice fly extended the A's lead to 5–3. Both starters went 4 innings. The Astros took the lead in the 6th inning when Josh Reddick reached on a fielding error with 2 outs, Martín Maldonado singled, George Springer doubled in Reddick, José Altuve doubled in both Maldonado & Springer & Michael Brantley singled in Altuve to make it 7–5. Correa hit his 2nd home run of the game to make it 8–5. The Astros broke it open in the 9th inning with a Correa RBI single & a Yuli Gurriel sacrifice fly. Ryan Pressly worked a 1-2-3 9th inning to seal the Game 1 victory for the Astros.

Game 2 
Left handed pitcher Sean Manaea will get the ball, he will be opposed by Astros lefty Framber Valdez. A's DH Khris Davis hit another home run to give the A's the lead in the 2nd inning. The Astros fought back and took the lead when George Springer hit a 2-run home run. The Astros added another run on an RBI groundout. The A's would strike back with a Chad Pinder solo home run in the 4th inning. Martín Maldonado & Springer went back 2 back in the 5th inning. Both pitching staffs then held the game scoreless after that. With Astros closer Ryan Pressly picking up the save, the A's were put in an 0–2 ALDS hole.

Game 3
Astros manager Dusty Baker announced that right hander José Urquidy will get the ball for Game 3, while the A's will give the ball to lefty Jesús Luzardo. A's second baseman Tommy La Stella got the scoring started with a solo home run in the first inning. The Astros responded with a solo home run from José Altuve and an RBI groundout to take the lead. The A's responded again with a solo home run from left fielder Mark Canha. The A's took the lead in the 4th inning on an Olson solo home run. The A's would add another home run with a Marcus Semien solo shot. The Astros tied it in the bottom of the 5th inning with an Aledmys Díaz 2-run home run. The Astros would regain the lead with a Michael Brantley RBI single, an Alex Bregman RBI double and a Kyle Tucker RBI single. The A's would tie in the top of the 7th on a Pinder 3-run home run. The A's would add two sacrifice flies in the 8th inning to cap the scoring. A's closer Liam Hendriks pitched 3 scoreless innings to save the A's season and send the series to a Game 4.

Game 4
The A's started Frankie Montas while the Astros started Zack Greinke. A's outfielder Ramón Laureano got the scoring started with a 3-run home run. The Astros responded in the 4th inning with a 2-run home run from Astros DH Michael Brantley and a 3-run home run from Astros shortstop Carlos Correa. The A's responded in the 5th inning with another home run from Laureano that chased Greinke from the game. Lefty Blake Taylor came in and got the final out of the 5th inning. In the bottom of the 5th, Brantley hit his 2nd home run of the game and Correa added an RBI single to make it 7–4 Astros. In the 6th inning, Astros outfielder Kyle Tucker added an RBI single followed by another single for Correa that made it 9–4. Astros 2nd baseman José Altuve hit a 2-run home run to make it 11–4 Astros. Astros pitcher Cristian Javier pitched  scoreless innings. A's shortstop Marcus Semien got an RBI single & A's 2nd baseman Tommy La Stella singled in Semien before Astros closer then shut the door in the 9th inning to send the Astros to the ALCS and eliminate the A's

Postseason rosters

| style="text-align:left" |
Pitchers: 16 Liam Hendriks 23 Mike Minor 35 Jake Diekman 36 Yusmeiro Petit 38 T. J. McFarland 40 Chris Bassitt 44 Jesús Luzardo 47 Frankie Montas 48 Joakim Soria 50 Mike Fiers 55 Sean Manaea 57 J. B. Wendelken 62 Lou Trivino
Catchers: 12 Sean Murphy 37 Jonah Heim
Infielders: 3 Tommy La Stella 4 Jake Lamb 5 Tony Kemp 10 Marcus Semien 18 Chad Pinder 28 Matt Olson 39 Vimael Machín 46 Nate Orf 
Outfielders: 8 Robbie Grossman 20 Mark Canha 22 Ramón Laureano 25 Stephen Piscotty 
Designated hitters: 2 Khris Davis
|- valign="top"

| style="text-align:left" |
Pitchers: 16 Liam Hendriks 23 Mike Minor 35 Jake Diekman 36 Yusmeiro Petit 38 T. J. McFarland 40 Chris Bassitt 44 Jesús Luzardo 47 Frankie Montas 48 Joakim Soria 50 Mike Fiers 55 Sean Manaea 57 J. B. Wendelken 62 Lou Trivino 70 Jordan Weems 
Catchers: 12 Sean Murphy 37 Jonah Heim
Infielders: 3 Tommy La Stella 4 Jake Lamb 5 Tony Kemp 10 Marcus Semien 18 Chad Pinder 28 Matt Olson 46 Nate Orf
Outfielders: 8 Robbie Grossman 20 Mark Canha 22 Ramón Laureano 25 Stephen Piscotty
Designated hitters: 2 Khris Davis
|- valign="top"

Farm system

Notes

References

External links
2020 Oakland Athletics season at Baseball Reference

Oakland Athletics seasons
Oakland Athletics
2020s in Oakland, California
Oakland Athletics
American League West champion seasons